Standard cubic centimeters per minute (SCCM) is a unit used to quantify the flow rate of a fluid. 1 SCCM is identical to 1 cm³STP/min. Another expression of it would be Nml/min.  These standard conditions vary according to different regulatory bodies. One example of standard conditions for the calculation of SCCM is  = 0  °C (273.15 K)  and  = 1.01 bar (14.72 psia).

Conversion to mass flowrate and molar flowrate

For conversion purposes, it is useful to think of one SCCM as the mass flow rate of one cubic centimeter per minute of a fluid, typically a gas, at a density defined at some standard temperature, and pressure,  .

To convert one SCCM to the measure of mass flow rate in the SI system, kg/s, one relies in the fundamental relationship between mass flow rate and volumetric flow rate (see volumetric flow rate), 

where  is density at some standard conditions, and an equation of state such as

with  being the fluid molecular weight,  the fluid compressibility factor, and  the universal gas constant.

Thereafter, by replacing  with the above equation of state one obtains

Using this last relationship, one can convert a mass flow rate in the more familiar unit of kg/s to SCCM and vice versa with

and 

With this conversion from SCCM to kg/s, one can then use available unit calculators  to convert kg/s to other units, such as g/s of the CGS system, or slug/s.

Based on the above formulas, the relationship between SCCM and molar flow rate in kmol/s is given by

and

Conversion examples

For some usage examples, consider the conversion of 1 SCCM to kg/s of a gas of molecular weight , where  is in kg/kmol.  Furthermore, consider standard conditions of 101325 Pa and 273.15 K, and assume the gas is an ideal gas (i.e.).  Using the unity bracket method (see conversion of units) one obtains:

Considering nitrogen, which has a molecular weight of 28 kg/kmol, 1 SCCM of nitrogen in kg/s is given by:

To do the same for 1 SCCM of helium, which has a molecular weight of 4 kg/kmol, one obtains:

Notice that 1 SCCM of helium is less in kg/s than one SCCM of nitrogen.

To convert 50 SCCM of nitrogen with the above considerations one does

Related units of flow measurement

A unit related to the SCCM is the SLM or SLPM which stands for Standard litre per minute.  Their conversion is 

and

Another unit is the SCFM which stands for standard cubic feet per minute.

Yet another unit related to SCCM (and SLM) is the PCCM (and PLM) which stands for Perfect Cubic Centimeter per Minute (Perfect Litre per Minute).  One PCCM is one SCCM when the gas is ideal.  In other words, one PCCM is exactly the same as one SCCM if and only if  in the above relationships.

References 

Fluid dynamics
Units of flow